The Qatari Stars Cup is a Qatari football competition played during the Qatar Stars League season known as Ooredoo Cup due to sponsorship reasons. 

The knockout competition, which involves a round-robin league structure, was first started in 2009 when the Qatar Stars League structure was amended. The competition was generally formed to give clubs more competitive games during the regular season and is open only to clubs playing in the Qatar Stars League.

History

2009: Al-Gharafa SC 5–0 Al Ahli SC
2010: Al-Sadd SC 1–0 Umm Salal SC
2011–12: Al-Wakrah SC 0–0 (10–9 pen.) Al-Kharitiyath SC
2012–13: El Jaish 2–0 Al-Arabi
2013–14: Qatar SC 3–2 Al-Sadd SC
2017–18: Al-Gharafa SC 3–2 Al-Rayyan SC
2018–19: Al-Gharafa SC 1–0 Al-Duhail SC
2019–20: Al-Sadd SC 4–0 Al-Arabi 
2020–21: Al-Sailiya SC 2–0 Al-Rayyan SC
2021–22: Al-Sailiya SC 5–4 Al-Wakrah SC

Total titles

References

External links
 Qatar Stars Cup - QSL
 Qatar Stars Cup - Hailoosport.com (Arabic)
 Qatar Stars Cup - Hailoosport.com

 
Stars
2009 establishments in Qatar
Recurring sporting events established in 2009